WKEY-FM (93.7 MHz) is a radio station located in Key West, Florida, United States. It is owned by Radio One Key West, LLC, and broadcasts a yacht rock format known as Key 93.

History
The station went on the air as WKRY on 93.5 MHz on November 17, 1985; by 1989, it was an easy listening station with 20 hours of jazz music and 8 hours of classical music a week. On November 23, 1999, the station changed its call sign to the current WKEY-FM. On June 8, 2011, WKEY-FM changed formats to oldies, branded as "True Oldies". The station was moved to 93.7 MHz in 2013 as a contingency of relocating 104.3 MHz from West Palm Beach south toward the Miami market.

In 2016, Jonathan Smith's Choice Radio Keys Corporation, who acquired it in 2016. By that time, it was operating as part of a regional simulcast with WGMX and WKEZ-FM, known as "The Mix". The station then changed to classic hits as "Mix 93.7" on April 1, 2017. Due to an inability to pay outstanding debts, the company assigned the licenses of those stations and AM outlet WFFG to a trustee on June 4, 2018, to be sold for the benefit of creditors.

Effective November 4, 2020, the trustee sold WKEY-FM to Spottswood Partners II, Ltd., for $15,000 and the cancellation of a lease valued at $85,899. The station had been off the air since March 2020, with the trustee citing needed tower work. On January 8, 2021, WKEY-FM resumed broadcasting, branded as "93.7 NRG", a new non-stop dance and disco music format created by NRG Media of Florida, which leased the station from Spottswood.

WKEY was purchased by Radio One Key West, LLC—headed by Buffalo, New York, broadcaster William Ostrander, who goes by the name "Buddy Shula" and owns WECK serving that city—on October 1, 2022, for $301,000. On October 18, WKEY-FM‘s format changed from smooth jazz to "mellow rock", branded as "Key 93".

References

External links

Radio stations established in 1985
WKEY-FM
1985 establishments in Florida
Soft adult contemporary radio stations in the United States